Caohe may refer to the following locations in China:

 Caohe Township (曹河乡), Huaiyang County, Henan
 Caohe Subdistrict (草河街道), Fengcheng, Liaoning
Towns
All are written as "漕河镇":
 Caohe, Xushui County, Hebei
 Caohe, Qichun County, in Qichun County, Hubei
 Caohe, Yanzhou, in Yanzhou, Shandong